is a village located in the Kerama Islands in Okinawa Prefecture, Japan. It includes 10 islands, of which only Tokashiki and Maejima are inhabited, with Maejima only having very few residents. The village is part of Shimajiri District. Tokashiki is known for its corals, sea, beach and sun. From Tomari Port in Naha, it takes less than one hour to reach this island.

On 28 March 1945, during World War II, 394 inhabitants, mostly from farmer families, were forced by Japanese soldiers to immolate themselves with grenades after the landing of US troops.

Geography

The village of Tokashiki consists of 10 islands of various sizes in the center of the Kerama Islands. The islands of village, particularly on Tokashiki Island itself, are rugged and mountainous.

Climate

History

Early history

Prior to World War II Tokashiki produced charcoal for the city of Naha. Bonito fishing was also a mainstay of the population of the island, but as the bonito industry declined, the population of the village was reduced greatly.

World War II

The American forces landed on Tokashiki on March 27, 1945, as an early part of the Battle of Okinawa. On the following day, March 28, 1945, 394 inhabitants of Tokashiki, mostly from farming families, immolated themselves with grenades after the landing of US troops, at the command of Japanese soldiers, in a practice that became known as shūdan jikketsu, or group suicide. The group suicide on Tokashiki in late March was a precursor to large-scale group suicides on Okinawa Island in the following months.

Maejima
The island Maejima once had a population of 380, but a string of powerful typhoons forced the inhabitants to eventually abandon their homes and leave the island, with the last 4 families leaving in February 1962. From then on the island was uninhabited for 42 years until in 2003 a former resident moved back to the island together with his family.

Transportation
Tokashiki Island is connected to Tomari Port in Naha by ferry.

Economy

Agriculture

Tokashiki is home to small-scale farming. A small amount of vegetables are produced in the village.

Tourism

The village of Tokashiki is part of Okinawa Kaigan Quasi-National Park and is blessed with a remarkable number of spots of scenic beauty. Due to this, the village has promoted tourism as a primary industry since the reversion of Okinawa Prefecture to Japan in 1972. Numerous tourist facilities such as hotels, esplanades, and viewing towers have been built across Tokashiki Island.

Noted places
Shinrin Park. The park is accessible from the Aharen district only by foot, and consist of a wide grassy area and a large-scale wooden for children. Shinrin Park is quiet as it has relatively few visitors.

References

External links

Villages in Okinawa Prefecture
Populated coastal places in Japan